Steve McDonald (born 9 September 1950) is a New Zealand composer, singer, and instrumentalist who performs in the Celtic fusion musical style. He performed in rock bands Timberjack, Dizzy Limits, and Human Instinct before embarking on a solo career. He has composed musical scores for television shows and documentaries. Beginning in the early 1990s, McDonald has explored his Scottish heritage through a series of Celtic recordings.
He is published on the Etherean Music music label.

Solo albums
Spinfield (Hearts of Space Records) 
Sons of Somerled
Stone of Destiny (album)
Winter in Scotland: A Highland Christmas
The Message (Steve McDonald album)
Highland Farewell
Legend (Steve McDonald album)

References

External links
AOL Music Biography
AOL Music Discography
Answers.com Biography
Last.fm Artist Page

1950 births
Living people
New Zealand singer-songwriters
New Zealand people of Scottish descent